Psychoactive plants are plants, or preparations thereof, that upon ingestion induce psychotropic effects. As stated in a reference work:

Psychoactivity may include sedative, stimulant, euphoric, deliriant, and hallucinogenic effects.

Several hundred psychoactive plants are known.
Some popular examples of psychoactive plants include Coffea arabica (coffee), Camellia sinensis (tea), Nicotiana tabacum (tobacco), and Cannabis (including hashish).

Psychoactive plants have been used ritually (e.g., peyote as an entheogen), medicinally (e.g., opium as an analgesic), and therapeutically (e.g., cannabis as a drug) for thousands of years. Hence, the sociocultural and economic significance of psychoactive plants is enormous.

Examples of psychoactive plants 

In the table below, a few examples of significant psychoactive plants and their effects are shown.
For further examples, see List of psychoactive plants.

Botanical taxonomy 
Botanical taxonomy delimits groups of plants and describes and names taxa based on these groups to identify other members of the same taxa. The circumscription of taxa is directed by the principles of classification, and the name assigned is governed by a code of nomenclature. In the plant kingdom (Plantae), almost all psychoactive plants are found within the flowering plants (angiosperms).
There are many examples of psychoactive fungi, but fungi are not part of the plant kingdom.
Some important plant families containing psychoactive species are listed below. The listed species are examples only, and a family may contain more psychoactive species than listed.

Phytochemistry 
Phytochemistry is the study of phytochemicals, which are chemicals derived from plants. Phytochemists strive to describe the structures of the large number of secondary metabolites found in plants, the functions of these compounds in human and plant biology, and the biosynthesis of these compounds. Plants synthesize phytochemicals for many reasons, including to protect themselves against insect attacks and plant diseases. The compounds found in plants are of many kinds, but most can be grouped into four major biosynthetic classes: alkaloids, phenylpropanoids, polyketides, and terpenoids. Active constituents of the majority of psychoactive plants fall within the alkaloids (e.g., nicotine, morphine, cocaine, mescaline, caffeine, ephedrine), a class of nitrogen-containing natural products. Examples of psychoactive compounds of plant origin that do not contain nitrogen are tetrahydrocannabinol (a phytocannabinoid from Cannabis sativa) and salvinorin A (a diterpenoid from Salvia divinorum).

See also

References

External links 
 Erowid – Psychoactive Plants & Fungi

Herbal and fungal hallucinogens